Cornelius Clifford Floyd Jr. (born December 5, 1972) is a former Major League Baseball left fielder who played for 17 seasons, most notably for the Montreal Expos, Florida Marlins and New York Mets. He is currently a baseball analyst who co-hosts on Sirius XM Radio and appears on MLB Network.

Early years
Floyd was born to parents Cornelius Clifford Floyd, Sr. and Olivia Floyd. After spending 13 years as an only child, Floyd was joined by brother Julius. Sister Shanta was later adopted when the Floyds noticed her as a six-year-old classmate of Julius' who had been troublesome for her then adoptive parents. The three siblings were raised in Markham, Illinois, a small suburb south west of Chicago. Floyd's father, a former Marine, worked double shifts at a U.S. Steel plant in Chicago to allow the family to live in a safe and stable neighborhood.

At Thornwood High School in South Holland, Illinois, Floyd was a three-sport star in baseball, football, and basketball. In basketball, he led his high school to the Class AA Sectional Playoffs. He hit .508 with 130 RBI during the final two years of his high school career and led his team to the Illinois Class AA state baseball championship as a senior. He was heavily recruited by Arizona State University, Stanford, and Creighton University and signed a letter of intent to play for head coach Jim Hendry at Creighton. However, when the Montreal Expos drafted him as the 14th pick in the 1st round of the 1991 Major League Baseball draft, Floyd chose to go to the minor leagues.

Major league career

Montreal Expos
Prior to being called up by the Expos, Floyd won The Sporting News Minor League Player of the Year Award in 1993 after successful stints with the Harrisburg Senators of the Eastern League and Triple-A Ottawa Lynx. He made his major league debut that same year at only 21 years old, playing in 10 games with the Expos. On June 27, 1994, Floyd hit a home run off Atlanta Braves pitcher Greg Maddux at Olympic Stadium on a pitch that was low, by golfing the ball out in what would become a signature moment in the Expos dominant but strike-shortened 1994 season. Although Floyd never showed the power that was to come in later years during his first tenure with the Expos, he has expressed fondness for his time in Montreal, crediting his initial experience there for helping him grow both professionally and as a person.

Florida Marlins
In , Floyd was traded from the Expos to the Florida Marlins for Dustin Hermanson and Joe Orsulak. He won his lone World Series with the franchise in 1997. In , Floyd earned a starting position in the Marlins' outfield. In , in 420 at-bats, he hit .300 with 22 home runs and 91 RBI, including two walk-off home runs. In 2001, Floyd hit 31 home runs and set career highs with a .317 batting average and 103 RBIs in 149 games and was selected to play in his first and only All-Star Game.

Second stint with Expos
In , Floyd was traded from the Marlins back to the Expos, with Claudio Vargas, Wilton Guerrero, and cash, for Graeme Lloyd, Mike Mordecai, Carl Pavano, Justin Wayne, and Donald Levinski. His second stint with the Expos was short-lived; he appeared in only 15 games before being traded.

Boston Red Sox
On July 30, 2002, Floyd was traded from the Expos to the Boston Red Sox for Sun-woo Kim and Song Seung-jun. Theories swirled around baseball as to the move (along with several others done by the Expos that year), with critics suggesting the MLB-owned Expos had traded Floyd in order to help the Red Sox. Floyd hit .317 in 47 games for the Red Sox.

New York Mets

In , Floyd was signed by the New York Mets. The next year, though, Floyd was once again limited by injuries and only played in 97 games during New York's division-winning year. He caught the division-clinching out for the Mets, but was slowed by injuries in the playoffs for New York, only recording twelve at-bats in his team's ten postseason games.

Chicago Cubs
On January 21, 2007, Floyd agreed to a one-year, $3 million deal with his hometown Chicago Cubs for the 2007 season. Floyd missed nine games in August 2007 to mourn the death of his father, Cornelius. He returned on August 21, 2007, to play the San Francisco Giants, where he drove in the winning runs in the top of the 9th.

Tampa Bay Rays
On December 14, 2007, Floyd signed a $3 million, one-year contract with the Tampa Bay Rays. Floyd spent 2008 platooning for the Rays at DH against righties.

San Diego Padres

On February 5, Floyd agreed to a one-year contract with the San Diego Padres. On October 8, 2009, the Padres released Floyd.

Career statistics
In 1621 games over 17 seasons, Floyd posted a .278 batting average (1,479-for-5,319) with 824 runs, 340 doubles, 23 triples, 233 home runs, 865 RBI, 148 stolen bases, 601 bases on balls, .358 on-base percentage and .482 slugging percentage. He finished his career with a .980 fielding percentage playing at all three outfield positions and at first base. In 19 postseason games, he batted .216 (8-for-37) scoring 7 runs with 2 home runs and 4 RBI.

Broadcasting career
On February 22, 2010, Floyd accepted a broadcasting job with Fox Sports Florida.

Floyd made his debut in the broadcasting booth for FOX Sports' Baseball Night in America on June 21, 2014.

In 2015, Floyd joined SportsNet New York where he would be an analyst for New York Mets games. On March 8, 2015, Floyd broadcast his first Mets game, a spring training game against the Boston Red Sox on WPIX-TV, with Gary Cohen doing play-by-play.

Floyd is currently a co-host on SiriusXM's MLB Network Radio and Fantasy Sports Radio. He is also a contributor to the MLB Network, occasionally appearing on its flagship studio show MLB Tonight.

In 2018, Floyd joined Sportsnet to become a featured analyst for the network's Toronto Blue Jays coverage.

In 2022, Floyd joined the Marquee Sports Network as a studio analyst and also appeared on Apple TV+ Friday Night Baseball as one of three rotating analysts.

Personal life
Floyd lives in Florida with his longtime companion Maryanne Manning, the couple's two children, his mother, and the two children of his sister Shanta. Shanta died in 2006 after a long battle with cancer.

In 1997, Floyd appeared in a Season 23 episode of Saturday Night Live in full Florida Marlins uniform with fourteen other MLB players.

He appeared on Season 9 and 10 of Dragons' Den.

See also

List of Major League Baseball career home run leaders

References

External links

Floyd Interview 6-30-06
 Cliff Floyd at SABR (Baseball BioProject)

1972 births
Living people
21st-century African-American sportspeople
20th-century African-American sportspeople
African-American baseball players
Albany Polecats players
American expatriate baseball players in Canada
Baseball players from Chicago
Baseball players from Miami
Boston Red Sox players
Brooklyn Cyclones players
Calgary Cannons players
Charlotte Knights players
Chicago Cubs players
Florida Marlins players
Harrisburg Senators players
Lake Elsinore Storm players
Major League Baseball broadcasters
Major League Baseball left fielders
MLB Network personalities
Montreal Expos players
National League All-Stars
New York Mets players
Ottawa Lynx players
People from Markham, Illinois
San Diego Padres players
South Suburban Bulldogs baseball players
St. Lucie Mets players
Tampa Bay Rays players
West Palm Beach Expos players